Christopher Gordon (born July 17, 1986 in New York City) is a professional squash player who represents the United States. He reached a career-high world ranking of World No. 44 in May, 2013. He won a silver medal at the 2011 Pan American Games in the doubles with partner Julian Illingworth.  His signature victory came in the 2012 U.S. Open in Philadelphia in the 1st round against Hisham Ashour in 5 games.  Chris broke the PSA World Tour record of most tournament appearances with 260 with his appearance in the NTA Squash Classic.

Career statistics
Listed below.

PSA Titles (5)
All Results for Christopher Gordon in PSA World's Tour tournament

PSA Tour Finals (runner-up) (5)

Junior Open Titles (1)

References

External links 
 
 
 
 

1986 births
Living people
American male squash players
Pan American Games medalists in squash
Pan American Games silver medalists for the United States
Pan American Games bronze medalists for the United States
Squash players at the 2015 Pan American Games
Medalists at the 2015 Pan American Games
Competitors at the 2009 World Games
Competitors at the 2013 World Games
Competitors at the 2022 World Games
Sportspeople from New York (state)